Monsignor (Mgr.) Vincent Sutikno Wisaksono, Pr. (Surabaya, East Java, Indonesia, 26 September 1953) is the current Bishop of Surabaya. He has held the position since 29 June 2007, replacing Mgr. John Sudiarna Hadiwikarta, Pr. who died on December 13, 2003, creating a vacancy in the Diocese of Surabaya. His motto as a bishop is "Ego veni ut vitam habeant, et abundantius habeant." (John 10:10), which means "I have come that they may have life and have it in all its abundance".

He was born Oei Tik Hauw, the second child of three brothers. His father was Stephanus Oei Kok Tjia (Wisaksono) and his mother Ursula Mady Kwa Siok.

He received his early education at Saint Michael's SDK Surabaya, then at SMPK Angelus Custos. He attended Garum Seminary, then followed his theological studies at Saint Paul Major Seminary, Faculty of Theology Wedabhakti, Yogyakarta.

He was ordained a priest on 21 January 1982 at the age of 28 years, by Mgr. Klooster CM in the Church of the Sacred Heart of Jesus Surabaya. He first served in the Parish of St. Joseph, Kediri, East Java.

On 3 April 2007, at the Mass acceptance confirmation at the Cathedral of the Sacred Heart of Jesus in Surabaya, the Apostolic Nuncio for Indonesia and East Timor, Mgr. Leopoldo Girelli, announced the appointment of Mgr. Vincent Sutikno Wisaksono as Bishop of Surabaya, following the declaration by Pope Benedict XVI. Acting as President is Archbishop of Jakarta, Bishop Julius Cardinal Darmaatmadja, who is assisted by the Archbishop of Semarang, Bishop Ignatius Suharyo and the Bishop of Malang, Bishop Herman Joseph Sahadat Pandoyoputro.

As bishop, he forbade the holding of Mass in the framework of the special Chinese New Year celebration in the Diocese of Surabaya, despite having Chinese descent.

References

Sources 
 UCAN Diocese profile

21st-century Roman Catholic bishops in Indonesia
Indonesian people of Chinese descent
1953 births
Living people
People from Surabaya